Theen (Also known as Kha Sam Liam) is an Austroasiatic language of Laos, belonging to the branch of Khmuic languages. It is only spoken by about 200 people living in two villages. They are also known as Kha Sam Liam among their Lao neighbours.

Speakers of the autonym  are located in Viengkham district, Luang Prabang Province, Laos.

Further reading
Shintani, Tadahiko L.A., Ryuichi Kosaka, and Takashi Kato. 2001. Linguistic Survey of Phongxaly, Lao P.D.R. Institute for the Study of Languages and Cultures of Asia and Africa (ILCAA). Tokyo. p. 213-215.
Chazée, Laurent. 1999. The Peoples of Laos: rural and ethnic diversities. Bangkok: White Lotus Co. Ltd. (see page 99).
Ngô Đức Thịnh; and Trương Văn Sihn. 1973. Vài nét về sự phân bố địa lý các nhóm ngôn ngữ ở lào hiện nay [About the distribution of linguistic groups in contemporary Laos]. Ngôn Ngữ 1.16–23. (This article contains a Thay-Then wordlist).

References

Khmuic languages